My Tehran for Sale (Persian :تهران من، حراج), is a 2009 Australian-Iranian feature film written and directed by poet turned filmmaker Granaz Moussavi, produced by Cyanfilms and starring Marzieh Vafamehr, and Amir Chegini and Asha Mehrabi.

Officially selected by Toronto, Rotterdam, Pusan and several other international film festivals, this film explores the contemporary Tehran and its underground art scene, focusing on the life of a young actress who has been banned from her theater work. Struggling to pursue her passion in art as well as her secret lifestyle in a socially oppressed environment, Marzieh gets involved in some subsequent and unexpected events leading her to a decision-making dilemma regarding her survival and identity. My Tehran for Sale has been compared with Cristian Mungiu's film 4 Months, 3 Weeks and 2 Days by Parviz Jahed, an Iranian critic and film scholar.

My Tehran For Sale is the winner of Independent Spirit Inside Film Awards 2009. It won the jury award for best feature Film at the TriMedia Film Festival in 2010. Apart from various festivals and universities the film was screened at Museum of Modern Art in New York as well as Cinémathèque Française in Paris.

Plot 
Marzieh is a young female actress who lives in Tehran. The authorities ban her to work at a theater, as many young actors in Iran, she is forced to lead a secret life in order to express herself artistically. At an underground rave she meets Iranian born Saman, now an Australian citizen, who offers her a way out of her country and the possibility of living without fear."

Awards and nominations 
The film has been an official selection to Toronto International Film Festival (Sep 2009), Vancouver International Film Festival (Sep-Oct 2009), Busan International Film Festival (Oct 2009), International Filmfestival Mannheim-Heidelberg (Nov 2009), Museum of Modern Art (New York, Jan 2010), International Film Festival Rotterdam (Jan 2010), International Film Festival Prague - Febiofest, 2010 Cinema Novo Film Festival Brugges 2010, CPH:PIX Copenhagen International Film Festival 2010, Guadalajara International Film Festival Mexico, Sydney Travelling Film Festival, Las Palmas de Gran Canaria International Film Festival, Human Rights Arts and Film Festival 2010, Focus on Asia Fukuoka International Film Festival 2010, Global Lens USA 2010, Dialogue of Cultures Film Festival New York 2011 and SVAW Film Festival Melbourne 2011, etc.

Controversy 
Controversy surrounded the film when unauthorized copies of the film hit the black market in Tehran extensively. In July 2011, Iranian authorities arrested Vafamehr, reportedly for acting in the film without proper Islamic hijab and with a shaved head. She was sentenced to one year in prison and 90 lashes, however due to international pressure and various campaigns, an appeals court later reduced her sentence to only three months' imprisonment. She was released in October 2011.

References

2009 films
Iranian independent films
Australian independent films
2009 independent films